Melite de Manziquerta  or Melite Manziquerta (died 456), served as the Catholicos of the Armenian Apostolic Church.  Melite de Manziquerta died in 456.

456 deaths
Catholicoi of Armenia
Armenian Oriental Orthodox Christians